Edvard is a form of Edward and may refer to:

 Edvard Askeland (born 1954), Norwegian jazz musician
 Edvard Befring (born 1936), Norwegian educationalist
 Edvard Beneš (1884–1948), Czech politician
 Edvard Christian Danielsen (1888–1964), Norwegian military officer
 Edvard Diriks (1855–1930), Norwegian painter
 Edvard Drabløs (1883–1976), Norwegian actor and theatre director
 Edvard Engelsaas (1872–1902), Norwegian speed skater
 Edvard Eriksen (1876–1959), Danish-Icelandic sculptor
 Edvard Grieg (1843–1907), Norwegian composer
 Edvard Heiberg (1911–2000), Norwegian director and engineer
 Edvard Hjelt (1855–1921), Finnish chemist, politician and member of the Senate of Finland
 Edvard Hoem (born 1949), Norwegian writer
 Edvard Hultgren (1904–1984), Swedish boxer
 Edvard Huupponen (1898–1977), Finnish wrestler
 Edvard Isto (1865–1905), Finnish artist
 Edvard Kardelj (1910–1979), Yugoslav politician
 Edvard Johanson (1882–1936), Swedish trade union organizer
 Edvard Larsen (1881–1914), Norwegian triple jumper
 Edvard Lasota (born 1971), Czech football player
 Edvard Liljedahl (1845–1924), Norwegian politician
 Edvard Linna (1886–1974), Finnish gymnast
 Edvard Mirzoyan (1921–2012), Armenian composer
 Edvard Moser (born 1962), Norwegian psychologist and neuroscientist
 Edvard Munch (1863–1944), Norwegian painter
 Edvard Natvig (1907–1994), Norwegian decathlete
 Edvard Persson (1888–1957), Swedish actor and singer
 Edvard Petersen (1841–1911), Danish painter
 Edvard Poulsson (1858–1935), Norwegian physician
 Edvard Ravnikar (1907–1993), Slovenian architect
 Edvard Skagestad (born 1988), Norwegian footballer
 Edvard Westerlund (1901–1982), Finnish Greco-Roman wrestler

See also
 Edvarda
 Edvard Peperko Barracks, barracks in Ljubljana, the capital of Slovenia
 

Danish masculine given names
Norwegian masculine given names
Scandinavian masculine given names
Swedish masculine given names
Finnish masculine given names